Lace House, also known as the Robertson House, is a historic home located at Columbia, South Carolina. It was built in 1854, and is a two-story, five bay, frame dwelling on an English basement. It features a two-story, projecting front porch with ornate cast iron porch supports, and lace-like railings and trim.

It was added to the National Register of Historic Places in 1969. It is located in Columbia Historic District I. The house is currently used as a wedding venue.

References

Houses on the National Register of Historic Places in South Carolina
Houses completed in 1854
Houses in Columbia, South Carolina
National Register of Historic Places in Columbia, South Carolina
Historic district contributing properties in South Carolina